The 1982 Women's Cricket World Cup, known as the 1982 Hansells Vita Fresh World Cup for sponsorship purposes, was an international cricket tournament played in New Zealand from 10 January to 7 February 1982. Hosted by New Zealand for the first time, it was the third edition of the Women's Cricket World Cup, coming four years after the previous 1978 World Cup in India.

The tournament, which featured a triple round-robin, was at the time the longest World Cup both in duration and the number of matches played. Five teams were originally invited in addition to the hosts, but the Netherlands were unable to attend and the West Indies withdrew in protest at New Zealand hosting the 1981 South Africa rugby union tour during the apartheid-era in South Africa. Those teams were instead replaced by a composite International XI team. Australia did not lose a single match, winning its second consecutive tournament by defeating England in the final at Lancaster Park, Christchurch. Australia's thirteen matches without defeat were part of a greater series of 24 matches without defeat, extending from 1978 to 1985, which was a One Day International (ODI) record before being broken by themselves in 2021 which consists of a streak of 26 matches extending from 2018 to 2021. The World Cup was marked by its low scoring, with only one team recording more than 250 runs in an innings, and was also notable for featuring two matches that were tied – the first between England and New Zealand, and the second between England and Australia. They were the first ties in international women's cricket. England's Jan Brittin led the tournament in runs, while Australian spinner Lyn Fullston led the tournament in wickets.

Background
Jack Hayward and Rachael Heyhoe-Flint organised the 1973 Women's Cricket World Cup, predating the first men's Cricket World Cup by two years. The tournament was played as a league format; the team who topped the points table at the conclusion would be champions. England beat Australia in the last match of the tournament to become the first Women's World Cup winners. The second Women's Cricket World Cup was scheduled to take place in South Africa in 1978, but with that country facing increasing sporting boycotts due to its apartheid policies, and withdrawals for financial reasons by the Netherlands and West Indies, the tournament was in jeopardy. The 1978 Women's Cricket World Cup was belatedly relocated to India, and featured only four teams. The tournament was once again played in a league format, but as in 1973, the final group match acted as a de facto final: Australia beat England to become champions.

During the 1978 World Cup, the International Women's Cricket Council (IWCC) met. The IWCC had not been involved in the running of either of the first two world cups, but felt that there had been a lack of organisation, and announced that they would be more involved with future world cups. Despite the involvement of the IWCC, the organisation of the 1982 event still primarily rested on the New Zealand Women's Cricket Council; which itself was mostly formed of the players themselves. They spent eighteen months planning the tournament. Their efforts resulted in the Women's World Cup having a title sponsor for the first time; it was officially known as the Hansells Vita Fresh World Cup.

Format
Unlike the two previous women's world cups, the 1982 tournament featured a final. A round-robin league stage involved each of the five teams playing each other three times each; a total of 30 group matches, from which the top two teams qualified for the final. The tournament took place over 29 days, from 10 January to 7 February. Each match was played as a 60-overs-per-side contest.

Participants
Five teams were invited: Australia, England, India, the Netherlands and the West Indies, but as in 1978, South Africa were not invited due to the ongoing boycott. Despite the increased sponsorship, and the involvement of the IWCC, participating teams and players had to fund their own visit. For example, each Indian player had to pay ₨10,000 (roughly £570, or US$1,000 at the time). This cost was prohibitive for the Dutch team, who withdrew from the tournament, as they had four years earlier. The West Indies also pulled out, in protest that New Zealand had hosted the apartheid-era South African rugby team in 1981. In order to prevent another four-team competition, the organising committee decided to invite a selection of players to form an International XI, as had featured at the 1973 World Cup.

Squads

Venues

Group stage

Summary
The tournament began on 10 January 1982 with two matches played in Auckland. Australia beat India by 153 runs, a new record margin in women's ODIs. In the other match, another record was set; England and New Zealand played out the first tied match in women's ODIs. The tournament remained in Auckland for the next round of matches on 12 January; England beat India by four wickets, while New Zealand surpassed the record set by Australia two days earlier, by beating the International XI by 184 runs, a record which would stand for six years. New Zealand set another new record in their next match two days later, when they bowled India out for what was, at the time, the lowest total in women's ODIs: 37. On the same day in Hamilton, England beat the International XI by 132 runs. Australia beat New Zealand by eight wickets and England by 44 runs on consecutive days in New Plymouth, while India completed a 79-run victory over the International XI in Napier. England remained in New Plymouth, and beat New Zealand by seven wickets the day after their loss to Australia.

Continuing to move south, Australia beat the International XI by 64 runs in Palmerston North, while on the same day India beat England by 47 runs, India's first win over England, and a victory The Guardian described at the time as India's "best ever result in the World Cup". On 21 January, New Zealand beat the International XI by 97 runs. Two days later, Australia beat England by six wickets. England played again the next day, beating the International XI by nine wickets, while New Zealand beat India by eight wickets. Australia then won twice in two days, beating the International XI by 146 runs and India by four wickets. In the last round of matches played in the North Island, England beat New Zealand by five wickets, New Zealand then lost to Australia by 69 runs, before India beat the International XI by 78 runs.

The tournament moved to the South Island on 30 January; Australia beat the International XI by 76 runs in Dunedin. The next day, England beat India by ten wickets, and New Zealand beat the International XI by 84 runs. Australia and England tied the 25th match of the tournament; it was England's second tie of the group stage, and the second ever in women's ODIs. India were once again bowled out cheaply by New Zealand in their next match, and were beaten by eight wickets. On 4 February, Australia and England both posted large totals in their victories; Australia scored 193 for five as they beat India by 39 runs, while England scored 242 for four in a 113-run over the International XI. Two days later, Australia beat New Zealand by 41 runs, and India beat the International XI by 14 runs; meaning that the International XI did not record a win in the competition. In the final match of the group stage, Australia beat England by three wickets.

Having remained unbeaten throughout the tournament, only dropping points in their tie with England, Australia finished top of the table. England trailed them by fourteen points in second place; both qualified for the final. New Zealand won all their matches against India and the International XI, but against Australia and England, only gained points during their tie with England. India's victory over England was their only win that did not come against the International XI.

Points table

 Teams marked  progressed to the final.
 Note: run rate was to be used as a tiebreaker in the case of teams finishing on an equal number of points, rather than net run rate, which is now common.

Matches

Final

The final was the only match of the tournament played at Lancaster Park, Christchurch, and took place in front of a crowd of 3,000. Dickie Bird became the only umpire to stand in both a men's and women's World Cup final. England won the toss and batted first. They scored slowly until the last ten overs of their innings; Jan Southgate made their highest score, with 53 runs, but found batting difficulty against Australia's spin bowling. In the last ten overs, England played more expansively, and eventually finished with 151 runs, meaning that Australia would need to score 152 to win. Australia lost three wickets early in their chase, but were steadied by a partnership between Karen Read and Sharon Tredrea. Quick scoring from Jen Jacobs and Marie Cornish late-on in the innings helped Australia to their target with six balls remaining, securing a three-wicket victory, and their second World Cup title.

Statistics
England's Jan Brittin finished with the most runs during the World Cup, having accumulated 391, ahead of the 383 scored by Lynne Thomas of the International XI and Susan Goatman, also of England, who scored 374. Brittin also made the highest score of the tournament, when she scored 138 not out against the International XI. The only other century of the tournament came against the same opposition: Barbara Bevege's 101. The best averages of the competition were achieved by England's Heyhoe-Flint, with 47.83, and two Australians, Jill Kennare (43.87) and Lyn Fullston (41.00).

Amongst the bowlers, Fullston took the most wickets (23), followed by Jackie Lord of New Zealand, with 22, and India's Shubhangi Kulkarni, who took 20. Lord had the best bowling figures in an innings, when she took six wickets against India. The only other bowler to take five wickets in an innings was Fullston, who did so against New Zealand, taking five for 27. Kulkarni had the best bowling average in the World Cup, collecting her wickets at 11.70. She was followed by Fullston (12.00) and Lord (12.40). The most economical bowler was New Zealand's Sue Brown, who conceded 1.53 runs per over, followed by a pair of Australians; Cornish (1.76) and Denise Martin (1.77).

Leading run scorers

Leading wicket takers

Notes

References

External links
 Series home at ESPN Cricinfo

 
1982
1982 in women's cricket
1982 in New Zealand cricket
World Cup 1982
January 1982 sports events in New Zealand
February 1982 sports events in New Zealand